Nassovia (minor planet designation: 534 Nassovia) is a minor planet orbiting the Sun. It is a member of the Koronis family of asteroids.

References

External links
 
 

Koronis asteroids
Nassovia
Nassovia
Princeton University
S-type asteroids (Tholen)
Sq-type asteroids (SMASS)
19040419